Gisela Hämmerling (born 26 December 1969) is a Swiss judoka. She competed in the women's half-middleweight event at the 1992 Summer Olympics.

References

1969 births
Living people
Swiss female judoka
Olympic judoka of Switzerland
Judoka at the 1992 Summer Olympics
Place of birth missing (living people)
20th-century Swiss women